The Unión Sindical de Trabajadores de Guatemala (UNSITRAGUA) is a national trade union center in Guatemala. UNSITRAGUA - is an umbrella organization with nationwide presence that integrates unions of workers of the branches of Industry, Services, Agricultural, self-employment and Independents.

References

Trade unions in Guatemala